Typhlonectes (from  , 'blind' and  , 'swimmer') is a genus of caecilians in the family Typhlonectidae.

The genus contains two species:
 Typhlonectes compressicauda (Typhlonectes cunhai)
 Typhlonectes natans

References

 
Amphibian genera
Taxonomy articles created by Polbot